The Stony Brook Film Festival, produced by Staller Center for the Arts at Stony Brook University, presents a  program of new, independent films every summer since 1996. Features and short films from the U.S. and around the world are screened over ten days at Staller Center, which has been the venue since the Festival's beginning. The festival is the brain child of the Staller Center's current director Alan Inkles. The festival continues to gain momentum and has gathered a faithful following. The festival draws a crowd of over 15,000 people.

2015 Festival
The 20th Annual Stony Brook Film Festival, July 16–25, 2015  presents ten evenings of features, shorts and documentaries. Stony Brook seeks fresh and inventive stories, intense character studies, impeccable direction and the highest production values in Independent Cinema. The Stony Brook Film Festival is a sought-after venue for filmmakers, sales agents, and distributors from around the world, who enjoy having their films shown on one of the region's largest screens to audiences of up to 1,000 viewers. The Stony Brook Film Festival is produced by Staller Center for the Arts at Stony Brook University.

See also

References

Film festivals in New York (state)
Film Festival
Tourist attractions in Suffolk County, New York